Bruce R. Gaitsch (born February 7, 1953) is an American guitarist, composer, and producer. He is best known for working with notable bands and musicians such Chicago, Peter Cetera, Madonna, and Agnetha Fältskog as a session musician and songwriter. Gaitsch co-wrote the Madonna song "La Isla Bonita", an international #1 single that earned Gaitsch an award from the American Society of Composers, Authors and Publishers in 1987. He has collaborated numerous times with fellow Chicago native Richard Marx whose career he was instrumental in launching.

Bruce is married to singer Janey Clewer with whom he recorded several albums.

Discography

Solo albums 

 1995 – A Lyre in a Windstorm
 1997 – Aphasia
 2002 – Nova
 2003 – One on One (with Janey Clewer)
 2003 – Countertale (with Tommy Denander)
 2006 – Nightingale
 2006 – Sincerely

with the Band The Bossa Nova Hotel 

 2009 - Moon Island (with Janey Clewer & Michael Sembello)
 2016 - Fragile (single)

with the Band GIG 

 2018 - Brave New World
 2022 - Wisdom And Madness

with the Band TIM 
 2021 - S/T

Other appearances 
 1977 – Jim Peterik – Don't Fight the Feeling
 1984 – Barbra Streisand – Emotion
 1984 – Stephanie Mills – I've Got the Cure
 1984 – Evelyn "Champagne" King – So Romantic
 1985 – Evelyn "Champagne" King – A Long Time Coming
 1986 – Pauli Carman – Dial My Number
 1986 – Madonna – True Blue
 1987 – Timothy B. Schmit – Timothy B.
 1987 – Richie Havens – Simple Things
 1987 – Richard Marx – Richard Marx
 1987 – Martha Davis – Policy
 1987 – Jody Watley – Jody Watley
 1988 – Gary Wright – Who I Am
 1988 – Nick Kamen – Us
 1988 – Glenn Frey – Soul Searchin'
 1988 – Peter Cetera – One More Story
 1988 – Julio Iglesias – Non Stop
 1988 - Siedah Garrett - Kiss of Life
 1988 – Agnetha Fältskog – I Stand Alone
 1989 - Stacey Q - Nights Like This
 1989 – Richard Marx – Repeat Offender
 1989 – Julian Lennon – Mr. Jordan
 1989 – Madonna – Like A Prayer
 1989 – Poco – Legacy
 1990 – Timothy B. Schmit – Tell Me The Truth
 1990 – Glenn Medeiros – Glenn Medeiros
 1990 – Marc Jordan – C.O.W.
 1991 – Richard Marx – Rush Street
 1991 – Tommy Page – From The Heart
 1992 – Peter Cetera – World Falling Down
 1992 – Freddie Jackson – Time For Love
 1992 – Céline Dion – Celine Dion
 1992 – Bill Champlin – Burn Down the Night
 1992 – Restless Heart – Big Iron Horses
 1992 – Roger Waters – Amused To Death
 1993 – Jay Graydon – Airplay for the Planet
 1993 – Miho Nakayama – Wagamama na Actress
 1994 – Ednita Nazario – Pasiones
 1994 – Richard Marx – Paid Vacation
 1994 – 4Him – The Ride
 1995 – Dionne Farris – Wild Seed – Wild Flower
 1995 – Mark Winkler – Tales From Hollywood
 1995 – Peter Cetera – One Clear Voice
 1995 – Chicago – Night & Day: Big Band
 1995 – Sheena Easton – My Cherie
 1995 - Thomas Anders - Souled
 1995 – Michael W. Smith – I'll Lead You Home
 1995 – Bill Champlin – He Started To Sing
 1995 - Janey Clewer - Janey
 1996 – Tamara Champlin – You Won't Get To Heaven Alive
 1996 – Bill Champlin – Through It All
 1996 – 4Him – The Message
 1996 – Fee Waybill – Don't Be Scared by These Hands
 1996 – Amy Sky – 'Cool Rain
 1996 - Janey Clewer - Call Me Romantic
 1997 – Amy Morriss – Within The Sound of Your Voice
 1997 – Lara Fabian – Pure
 1997 – Richard Marx – Flesh and Bone
 1997 – Phillips Craig & Dean – Where Strength Begins
 1997 - Janey Clewer - When Stars Collide
 1998 – Deborah Franco – Deborah Franco
 1998 - Janey Clewer - Kiss By Kiss
 1999 – Yolanda Adams – Mountain High...Valley Low
 2000 – Wayne Watson – Wayne Watson
 2000 – Kenny Rogers – There You Go Again
 2000 – Elton John – The Road To El Dorado
 2000 – Tammy Trent – Set You Free
 2000 – Richard Marx – Days in Avalon
 2000 – Gladys Knight – At Last
 2000 – 4Him – Hymns: A Place of Worship
 2001 – Kelly Keagy – Time Passes
 2001 – Elton John – Songs from the West Coast
 2001 – Jim Brickman – Simple Things
 2001 – Hanne Boel – My Kindred Spirit
 2001 – Peter Cetera – Another Perfect World
 2001 – Charlotte Church – Enchantment
 2002 – AOR – L.A Reflection
 2002 – Jim Brickman – Valentine
 2002 – Chris Tomlin – Not to Us
 2003 – Jim Brickman – Valentine
 2003 – Amy Grant – Simple Things
 2003 – Ilse DeLange – Clean Up
 2003 – AOR Dreaming Of L.A
 2003 – Rodney Atkins – Honesty
 2004 – AOR Nothing But The Best
 2004 – Joshua Payne – Your Love, My Home
 2004 – Peter Cetera – You Just Gotta Love Christmas
 2004 – Bebo Norman – Try
 2004 – Richard Marx – My Own Best Enemy
 2004 – Joe Cocker – Heart & Soul
 2004 – Beth Nielsen Chapman – Look
 2004 – Michael W. Smith – Healing Rain
 2004 - Janey Clewer - Perfume
 2005 – Peter Cetera – Faithfully
 2005 – Cy Curnin – Mayfly
 2005 – Toni Braxton – Libra
 2006 – Michael W. Smith – Stand
 2006 – Kelly Keagy – I'm Alive
 2007 – Michael Paige – Michael Paige
 2008 – Richard Marx – Sundown
 2008 – Bill Champlin – No Place Left To Fall
 2008 – Chicago – Chicago XXXII: Stone of Sisyphus'''
 2008 – Richard Marx - Emotional Remains 2009 – Adele Morgan – This One Life 2010 – AOR L.A Ambition 2011 – George Canyon – Better Be Home Soon 2011 – Richard Marx – Stories To Tell 2011 – Lionville – Lionville 2012 – AOR L.A Temptation 2012 – Harry Shearer – Can't Take A Hint 2012 - Janey Clewer - Fallen For Brazil
 2012 - Janey Clewer - Love
 2013 – Fergie Frederiksen – Any Given Moment 2013 – Lara Fabian – Le Secret 2014 – Waylon – Heaven After Midnight 2014 – Beth Nielsen Chapman – Uncovered 
 2014 – Richard Marx – Beautiful Goodbye 2014 – Adam Cohen – Like a Man''
 2018 - Janey Clewer - Beautifully Broken
 2020 - Van de Forst - Unconditional
 2021 - Michael Kratz - TAFKATNO
 2021 - Bill Champlin - Livin' For Love
 2022 - Chicago - Born For This Moment
 2022 - GIG - Wisdom And Madness

References

External links 
 

1953 births
Living people
American male composers
20th-century American composers
Record producers from Illinois
Guitarists from Chicago
American male guitarists
20th-century American guitarists
20th-century American male musicians
21st-century American guitarists
21st-century American male musicians
Chicago (band) members